Brett Ratten (born 11 July 1971) is an Australian rules football coach and former player in the Australian Football League (AFL). He played 255 games for the Carlton Football Club between 1990 and 2003, including the club's 1995 premiership. He then served as Carlton's senior coach from 2007 to 2012.

Playing career

Carlton
Originally from Yarra Glen, Ratten made his debut for Carlton Football Club in the fifteenth round of the 1990 season.

In a career lasting 14 years, Ratten played mainly as an in-and-under midfielder. His unobtrusive style often escaped the attention of media and umpires early in his career. Famously, he won Carlton's best and fairest award in the record-breaking premiership season of 1995, including a game in round 17 against Fitzroy when he amassed 44 disposals, but failed to poll a single Brownlow vote from the umpires for the entire season. In the 1999 season, Ratten was credited with 265 clearances, which (as of 2021) remains the highest on record by a considerable margin – the next-highest is only 192.

Ratten won the Robert Reynolds Trophy (Carlton best and fairest) on three occasions: 1995, 1997, and in a tie with Scott Camporeale in 2000. Ratten was a part of Carlton's premiership team in 1995. He played for Victoria in the State of Origin games in 1996 and 1997. He was awarded All-Australian selection in 1997, 2000 and 2001, firmly cementing his skill in the centre. Ratten was inducted into the Carlton Hall of Fame in 1999. In 2009, statistical analysis company Champion Data announced that Ratten averaged 126.1 ranking points per game during the 2000–2009 decade, the highest of any player in the league.

During his time in football, he had eight arthroscopes on his right knee, three arthroscopes on his left knee and a medial ligament. His shoulder was also badly damaged in 2003, which ultimately led to Ratten announcing his retirement from his playing career in the middle of the 2003 season.

After Craig Bradley chose to step-down as captain at the end of 2001, Ratten was awarded the club's captaincy in 2002, a position he held until his own retirement. After his retirement, in the middle of the 2003 season, the captaincy was passed to Andrew McKay for the rest of the season.

Ratten played a total of 255 games and kicked 117 goals for Carlton from 1990 to 2003. He was also a member of Carlton's 1995 premiership team.

Coaching career

Melbourne Football Club assistant coach and Norwood Football Club (2004 - 2006)
After retiring from playing, Ratten spent one year as an assistant coach at the Melbourne Football Club under senior coach Neale Daniher for the 2004 AFL season, before leaving to take a head coaching role at the Norwood Football Club in the Eastern Football League's second division for two seasons.

Carlton Football Club (2007 - 2012)
Ratten returned to the Carlton Football Club as an assistant coach under senior coach Denis Pagan for the 2007 AFL season. On 24 July 2007, Pagan was sacked during the middle of the season. Ratten was then appointed as caretaker senior coach of Carlton for the remainder of the 2007 season. Carlton under Ratten lost the remaining six games of the 2007 season to finish in 15th place on the ladder. On 20 August 2007, Ratten was re-appointed as full-time Carlton Football Club senior coach, when he signed a contract until the end of 2009. In the 2008 AFL season, Carlton under Ratten finished in 11th place on the ladder with 10 wins and 12 losses, missing out on the finals. 

Under Ratten's coaching, Carlton returned to the finals after a long period of poor performances under Pagan. Carlton reached the finals in the 2009 season, Ratten's second season, finishing seventh and ending a seven-year finals drought, the longest in the club's history. However, Carlton were eliminated by the Brisbane Lions in their elimination final in the 2009 AFL finals series.  His contract was extended until the end of 2011 as a result of this improved performance. 

Late in the 2010 season, Ratten came under scrutiny as senior coach when Carlton had several big losses, but the club nevertheless reached the finals again, finishing eighth. Ratten began coaching from the boundary line rather than the coaches' box during the season. Carlton were however eliminated by the Sydney Swans in the elimination final in the 2010 finals series. In the 2011 season, he took the team to fifth and an elimination final victory against Essendon, the club's first finals win for 10 years. However, Carlton were eliminated by the West Coast Eagles in the semi-finals in the 2011 finals series. There had been speculation that renewal of Ratten's contract beyond 2011 was contingent on the club winning a final and his contract was extended to the end of 2013 after the season. 

Carlton's on-field performance under Ratten in the 2012 season was inconsistent and the club missed the finals, finishing in tenth position on the ladder with eleven wins and eleven losses, after setting pre-season expectations of a top four finish, and there was constant speculation during the year that Ratten would be sacked as a result. After the second-last round of the season in Round 22, 2012 after Carlton suffered an upset loss against Gold Coast Suns and was mathematically eliminated from finals contention, Ratten was sacked as senior coach of Carlton after his contract was terminated at the end of 2012, one year early. Including his six games as caretaker coach, Ratten coached 120 games for Carlton, recording 60 wins, a draw and 59 losses, bringing a winning percentage to 50 percent. He was the third person to both play and coach over 100 senior games for the Carlton Football Club, after Ken Hands and Norm Clark. Ratten was then replaced by Mick Malthouse as Carlton Football Club senior coach.

Hawthorn Football Club assistant coach (2013 - 2018)
On 5 October 2012, Ratten accepted an assistant coaching position at the Hawthorn Football Club under senior coach Alastair Clarkson. He commenced in November 2012 and subsequently was part of the club's 2013, 2014 and 2015 premiership coaching panel. Ratten left the Hawthorn Football Club at the end of the 2018 season.

St Kilda Football Club (2019 - 2022)

In 2019, St Kilda Football Club appointed Ratten as an assistant coach under senior coach Alan Richardson. Upon Richardson's resignation in 2019, Ratten was appointed the caretaker senior coach of St Kilda Football Club for the remainder of the 2019 season. In September 2019, after the end of the 2019 season, Ratten was re-appointed as full-time St Kilda Football Club senior coach.

In his first full season as St Kilda senior coach in the 2020 season, the competition was disrupted due to the COVID-19 pandemic, with the season first suspended between March and June and then largely relocated to Queensland as the pandemic took hold in Victoria. In the 2021 season the Saints fell back with on-field performance and finished 10th on the ladder with 10 wins and 12 losses and therefore missing out on the finals.

Ratten was sacked as senior coach of St Kilda on 13 October 2022 at the end of the 2022 season, after a club review in the wake of a disappointing 2022 season where the Saints won 11 games and lost 11 to finish 10th on the ladder, missing out on the finals. Ratten was then replaced by Ross Lyon as St Kilda senior coach, who returned in his second stint as Saints senior coach.

North Melbourne Football Club assistant coach (2023 - present)
On 24 November 2022, It was announced that Ratten joined the North Melbourne Football Club in a part-time role as assistant coach in the role of midfield coach, supporting fellow assistant coach in the role of midfield and line coach Jordan Russell under senior coach Alastair Clarkson.

Personal life
Ratten's 16 year old son Cooper was killed in a car crash on 16 August 2015.

Statistics

Playing statistics
 Statistics are correct to the end of the 2003 season

|- style="background-color: #EAEAEA"
! scope="row" style="text-align:center" | 1990
|style="text-align:center;"|
| 40 || 1 || 1 || 0 || 12 || 2 || 14 || 2 || 0 || 1.0 || 0.0 || 12.0 || 2.0 || 14.0 || 2.0 || 0.0
|-
! scope="row" style="text-align:center" | 1991
|style="text-align:center;"|
| 7 || 20 || 3 || 9 || 202 || 207 || 409 || 50 || 41 || 0.2 || 0.5 || 10.1 || 10.4 || 20.5 || 2.5 || 2.1
|- style="background-color: #EAEAEA"
! scope="row" style="text-align:center" | 1992
|style="text-align:center;"|
| 7 || 19 || 2 || 1 || 163 || 106 || 269 || 30 || 22 || 0.1 || 0.1 || 8.6 || 5.6 || 14.2 || 1.6 || 1.2
|-
! scope="row" style="text-align:center" | 1993
|style="text-align:center;"|
| 7 || 21 || 2 || 2 || 206 || 143 || 349 || 49 || 34 || 0.1 || 0.1 || 9.8 || 6.8 || 16.6 || 2.3 || 1.6
|- style="background-color: #EAEAEA"
! scope="row" style="text-align:center" | 1994
|style="text-align:center;"|
| 7 || 11 || 2 || 2 || 115 || 70 || 185 || 24 || 21 || 0.2 || 0.2 || 10.5 || 6.4 || 16.8 || 2.2 || 1.9
|-
! scope="row" style="text-align:center" bgcolor="F0E68C" | 1995
|style="text-align:center;"|
| 7 || 25 || 12 || 15 || 320 || 251 || 571 || 78 || 75 || 0.5 || 0.6 || 12.8 || 10.0 || 22.8 || 3.1 || 3.0
|- style="background-color: #EAEAEA"
! scope="row" style="text-align:center" | 1996
|style="text-align:center;"|
| 7 || 24 || 8 || 8 || 297 || 258 || 555 || 74 || 65 || 0.3 || 0.3 || 12.4 || 10.8 || 23.1 || 3.1 || 2.7
|-
! scope="row" style="text-align:center" | 1997
|style="text-align:center;"|
| 7 || 21 || 6 || 8 || 255 || 261 || 516 || 66 || 68 || 0.3 || 0.4 || 12.1 || 12.4 || 24.6 || 3.1 || 3.2
|- style="background-color: #EAEAEA"
! scope="row" style="text-align:center" | 1998
|style="text-align:center;"|
| 7 || 21 || 9 || 10 || 265 || 237 || 502 || 58 || 67 || 0.4 || 0.5 || 12.6 || 11.3 || 23.9 || 2.8 || 3.2
|-
! scope="row" style="text-align:center" | 1999
|style="text-align:center;"|
| 7 || 26 || 14 || 5 || 350 || bgcolor=FFBBFF | 320§  || bgcolor=FFBBFF | 670§  || 68 || 99 || 0.5 || 0.2 || 13.5 || 12.3 || 25.8 || 2.6 || 3.8
|- style="background-color: #EAEAEA"
! scope="row" style="text-align:center" | 2000
|style="text-align:center;"|
| 7 || 25 || 25 || 18 || 395 || 300 || bgcolor=FFBBFF | 695§  || 115 || 75 || 1.0 || 0.7 || 15.8 || 12.0 || 27.8 || 4.6 || 3.0
|-
! scope="row" style="text-align:center" | 2001
|style="text-align:center;"|
| 7 || 22 || 21 || 11 || 300 || 273 || 573 || 83 || 103 || 1.0 || 0.5 || 13.6 || 12.4 || 26.0 || 3.8 || 4.7
|- style="background-color: #EAEAEA"
! scope="row" style="text-align:center" | 2002
|style="text-align:center;"|
| 7 || 12 || 9 || 5 || 125 || 135 || 260 || 33 || 58 || 0.8 || 0.4 || 10.4 || 11.3 || 21.7 || 2.8 || 4.8
|-
! scope="row" style="text-align:center" | 2003
|style="text-align:center;"|
| 7 || 7 || 3 || 4 || 82 || 46 || 128 || 18 || 24 || 0.4 || 0.6 || 11.7 || 6.6 || 18.3 || 2.6 || 3.4
|- class="sortbottom"
! colspan=3| Career
! 255
! 117
! 98
! 3087
! 2609
! 5696
! 748
! 752
! 0.5
! 0.4
! 12.1
! 10.2
! 22.3
! 2.9
! 2.9
|}

Coaching statistics

|- 
! scope="row" style="text-align:center; font-weight:normal" | 2007*
|style="text-align:center;"|
| 6 || 0 || 6 || 0 || 0.0% || 15 || 16
|-
! scope="row" style="text-align:center; font-weight:normal" | 2008
|style="text-align:center;"|
| 22 || 10 || 12 || 0 || 45.5% || 11 || 16
|- 
! scope="row" style="text-align:center; font-weight:normal" | 2009
|style="text-align:center;"|
| 23 || 13 || 10 || 0 || 56.5% || 7 || 16
|-
! scope="row" style="text-align:center; font-weight:normal" | 2010
|style="text-align:center;"|
| 23 || 11 || 12 || 0 || 47.8% || 8 || 16
|- 
! scope="row" style="text-align:center; font-weight:normal" | 2011
|style="text-align:center;"|
| 24 || 15 || 8 || 1 || 64.6% || 5 || 17
|-
! scope="row" style="text-align:center; font-weight:normal" | 2012
|style="text-align:center;"|
| 22 || 11 || 11 || 0 || 50.0% || 10 || 18
|- 
! scope="row" style="text-align:center; font-weight:normal" | 2019*
|style="text-align:center;"|
| 8 || 5 || 3 || 0 || 60.0% || 14 || 18
|-
! scope="row" style="text-align:center; font-weight:normal" | 2020
|style="text-align:center;"|
| 19 || 11  || 8 || 0 || 57.9% || 6 || 18
|-
! scope="row" style="text-align:center; font-weight:normal" | 2021
|style="text-align:center;"|
| 22 || 10  || 12 || 0 || 45.5% || 10 || 18
|-
! colspan=2| Career totals
! 167
! 84
! 82
! 1
! 50.6%
! colspan=2|
|}
* = Caretaker coach

References

External links

Brett Ratten profile on the Official AFL Website of the Carlton Football Club
Brett Ratten page at Blueseum

1971 births
Living people
All-Australians (AFL)
Victorian State of Origin players
Carlton Football Club players
Carlton Football Club Premiership players
Carlton Football Club coaches
John Nicholls Medal winners
Australian rules footballers from Victoria (Australia)
Australia international rules football team players
St Kilda Football Club coaches
One-time VFL/AFL Premiership players
People from Yarra Ranges